Team Medellín–EPM is a Colombian UCI Continental cycling team founded in 2017.

Team roster

Major wins 

2017
 National Under-23 Time Trial Championships, Julián Cardona
Stage 1 Vuelta a Asturias, Weimar Roldán
 Overall Vuelta a la Comunidad de Madrid, Óscar Sevilla
 Overall Tour of Ankara, Brayan Ramírez
Stage 1, Brayan Ramírez
Stage 3, Juan Esteban Arango
Stage 4, Óscar Sevilla
 Overall Vuelta Ciclista de Chile, César Nicolas Paredes
Stage 4, Cristian Montoya
2018
 Overall Vuelta a San Juan, Óscar Sevilla
Stage 5, Óscar Sevilla
Time Trial, Pan American Championships, Walter Vargas
 Overall Vuelta Michoacán, Nicolás Paredes
2019
 National Under-23 Time Trial Championships, Harold Tejada
 National Under-23 Road Race Championships, Harold Tejada
 Overall Vuelta a la Independencia Nacional, Robinson Chalapud
Stage 1, Robinson Chalapud
Stage 6, Óscar Sevilla
 Overall Vuelta Ciclista a Chiloe, Óscar Sevilla
Prologue, Stages 2 & 4 (ITT), Óscar Sevilla 
 Overall Vuelta del Uruguay, Walter Vargas
Stage 6 (ITT) 
Stage 5 Tour of the Gila, Cristhian Montoya
 Overall Tour of Qinghai Lake, Robinson Chalapud
Stage 1 (TTT)
2020
Gran Premio de la Patagonia, José Tito Hernández
2021
Stage 4 (ITT) Vuelta al Táchira, Óscar Sevilla
 Overall Vuelta a Colombia, José Tito Hernández
Prologue, Óscar Sevilla
Stages 3 & 6 (ITT), Brayan Sánchez
Stage 7, Robinson Chalapud
Stage 1 Tour du Rwanda, Brayan Sánchez
 National Time Trial Championships, Walter Vargas
2022
 Overall Vuelta a Colombia, Fabio Duarte
Stage 5, Fabio Duarte
Stage 8, Aldemar Reyes
2023
 Overall Vuelta a San Juan, Miguel Ángel López
Stage 5, Miguel Ángel López 
 National Time Trial Championships, Miguel Ángel López

National champions 
2017
 Colombian U23 Time Trial Championship, Julián Cardona
2019
 Colombian U23 Time Trial Championship, Harold Tejada 
 Colombian U23 Road Race Championship, Harold Tejada
2021
 Colombian Time Trial Championship, Walter Vargas
2023
 Colombian Time Trial Championship, Miguel Ángel López

References

External links

UCI Continental Teams (America)
Cycling teams established in 2017
Cycling teams based in Colombia